Grégory Baugé (born  31 January 1985) is a French professional racing cyclist.

Early life
Bauge first took up sport at the age of eight, playing football. His father enrolled him in the Aubergenville cycling school. At that time he took part in road races, mountain biking and trial cycling.

In 2000 he joined a cycling club in Yvelines. Aware of his qualities and encouraged by his father, he gradually left road cycling to concentrate on track cycling. in July 2001, he participated in the French National cadet (15–16 years) sprint championships where he was beaten in the final by Guillaume Blot.

In November 2001 he joined the Creteil Athletic Union, and permanently dedicated himself to the track. The following year, at 17, he entered the National Institute for Sport and Physical Education in Paris.

Early career
He joined the France junior sprint team in 2002. With Mickaël Murat and Francois Pervis, he became World Champion in the Junior (17–18 years) team sprint discipline. With his coach Gerard Quintyn, he competed at the Athens Olympics in 2004. Bauge specialised in the opening lap of the team sprint.

At the 2008 Olympics, he won the silver medal in the team sprint.

2011 suspension
In January 2012 it was announced that Baugé had received a backdated 12-month suspension for missing doping tests. This meant that all his results for 2011 were nullified. This elevated Britain's Jason Kenny to gold medal position in the Sprint event at the 2011 World Championships, as well as giving the German Team Sprint team the gold medal in the same meet.

2012
Baugé regained the World Championship Sprint title by beating defending champion Jason Kenny in the final of the 2012 event. Baugé went on to win two Olympic silver medals, in the team sprint (losing to Great Britain in the final for the second successive games), and in the individual sprint (being defeated by Kenny in the final).

Major results

2002
1st in World Championship, Track, Team Sprint,. Juniors
2003
2nd in European Championship, Track, Keirin, Juniors, Moscow
1st in European Championship, Track, Sprint, Juniors, Moscow
2nd in National Championship, Track, 1 km, Juniors, France (FRA)
1st in National Championship, Track, Sprint, Juniors, France (FRA)
2nd in World Championship, Track, Sprint, Juniors, Moscow
1st in European Championship, Track, Team Pursuit, Elite, Moscow
2004
1st in National Championship, Track, Sprint, U23, France (FRA)
3rd in Manchester, Team Sprint (GBR)
1st in European Championship, Track, Team Pursuit, Elite, Valencia (ESP)
2005
2nd in Moscow, Keirin (RUS)
2nd in Moscow, Team Sprint (RUS)
2nd in Moscow, Sprint (RUS)
1st in Sydney, Team Sprint (AUS)
3rd in National Championship, Track, Team Sprint, Elite, France, Hyères (FRA)
3rd in European Championship, Track, Sprint, U23, Fiorenzuola
2006
1st in Los Angeles, Sprint (USA)
1st in Los Angeles, Team Sprint (USA)
1st in Sydney, Sprint (AUS)
2nd in Sydney, Team Sprint (AUS)
1st in World Championship, Track, Team Sprint, Elite, Bordeaux
2nd in European Championship, Track, Team Sprint, U23, Athens
2nd in European Championship, Track, Sprint, U23, Athens
1st in National Championship, Track, Team Sprint, Elite, France, Hyères (FRA)
2nd in National Championship, Track, Sprint, Elite, France, Hyères (FRA)
3rd in Moscow, Team Sprint (RUS)
2007
1st in Los Angeles, Sprint (USA)
2nd in Los Angeles, Team Sprint (USA)
1st in World Championship, Track, Team Sprint, Elite, Palma de Mallorca (SPA)
2nd in World Championship, Track, Sprint, Elite, Palma de Mallorca (SPA)
1st in European Championship, Track, Team Sprint, U23, Cottbus (GER)
1st in European Championship, Track, Sprint, U23, Cottbus (GER)
3rd in European Championship, Track, Keirin, U23, Cottbus (GER)
1st in National Championship, Track, Keirin, Elite, France (FRA)
1st in National Championship, Track, Sprint, Elite, France (FRA)
2nd in Beijing, Team Sprint (CHN)
2008
2nd in Los Angeles, Team Sprint (USA)
1st UCI Track Cycling World Championships, Team Sprint
2nd Olympics , Team Sprint
2009
1st in World Championship, Track, Sprint, Elite, Pruszków (POL)
2010
1st World Championship, Track, Sprint, Ballerup (DEN)
2011
1st World Championship, Track, Team sprint, Apeldoorn (NED)
1st World Championship, Track, Sprint, Apeldoorn (NED)
2012
1st World Championship, Track, Sprint, Melbourne (AUS)
2013
2nd European Championship, Track, Team sprint, Apeldoorn (NED)
2013
3rd World Championship, Track, Team sprint, Cali (COL)
2014
1st Sprint, Fenioux Piste International
1st Team sprint, Fenioux Piste International
2015
1st World Championship, Track, Team sprint, Paris (FRA)
1st World Championship, Track, Sprint, Paris (FRA)

References

External links

Interview

1985 births
Living people
People from Maisons-Laffitte
French male cyclists
Cyclists at the 2008 Summer Olympics
Cyclists at the 2012 Summer Olympics
Cyclists at the 2016 Summer Olympics
Olympic cyclists of France
Olympic silver medalists for France
Olympic bronze medalists for France
French people of Guadeloupean descent
UCI Track Cycling World Champions (men)
Olympic medalists in cycling
Doping cases in cycling
Medalists at the 2016 Summer Olympics
Medalists at the 2012 Summer Olympics
Medalists at the 2008 Summer Olympics
French sportspeople in doping cases
French track cyclists
Sportspeople from Yvelines
Cyclists at the 2019 European Games
European Games medalists in cycling
European Games silver medalists for France
Cyclists from Île-de-France
21st-century French people